Amber Rose Tamara Le Bon (born 25 August 1989) is an English fashion model.

Biography
Le Bon is the eldest of the three daughters of Duran Duran lead singer Simon Le Bon and model Yasmin Le Bon. She was born at the Humana Wellington Hospital in St. John's Wood, London and went to Newton Preparatory School in London in her early years before going to Heathfield School, Ascot, gaining A levels in Music, the History of Art and Photography.

In July 2009, she was voted the 'World's Hottest Celebrity Daughter' by visitors to Zootoday.com. Brands she has modelled for to date include Moschino and River Island. She was the face of Myla swimwear and fronted a campaign for shampoo brand Pantene.

Le Bon's maternal grandfather was Iranian. She has two younger sisters.

References

External links
 
 
 Amber Le Bon Unofficial Website 

1989 births
Living people
English female models
English people of Iranian descent
Models from London
People educated at Heathfield School, Ascot
People from Westminster